Abraham Flores Cruz (born 14 July 2002) is a Mexican professional footballer who plays as a centre-back for Liga MX club Tijuana.

Career statistics

Club

Honours
Mexico U17
CONCACAF U-17 Championship: 2019
FIFA U-17 World Cup runner-up: 2019

References

External links
 
 
 

Living people
2002 births
Mexican footballers
Mexico youth international footballers
Association football defenders
Club Tijuana footballers
Liga MX players
Footballers from Baja California
Sportspeople from Tijuana